Dieterich Leonhard Oskamp (1756-1803) aka Dirk Leonhard Oskamp was a Dutch natural history author.

Works
'Specimen botanico-physicum inaugurale, exhibens nonnula, plantarum fabricam, et veconomiam spectantia' (1789)
'Cineri immortalis præceptoris sepulcrali sacrum' (1792)
'Tabulae Plantarum Terminologicae, adjecta systematis Linnaei explicatione' (1793)
'Bericht wegens de uitgaave van een werk over de medicinaale kruiden' (1793)
'Afbeeldingen der artseny-gewassen met derzelver Nederduitsche en Latynsche beschryvingen' volume 1 (1796) - An adaptation of Johannes Zorn's "Icones plantarum medicinalium"
'Over de natuurlijke en ingeënte kinderpokjes' (1797)
'Naauwkeurige Beschryving van den grooten en kleinen Orang-outang' (1803)

External links
Zorn, J., Oskamp, D.L., 'Afbeeldingen der artseny-gewassen met derzelver Nederduitsche en Latynsche beschryvingen', vol. 1 (1796-1800)

References

Dutch naturalists